This is list of archives in Brazil.

Archives in Brazil 

 Brazilian National Archives
 Arquivo Edgard Leuenroth
 Brazilian Studies Institute (University of São Paulo)
 Arquivo Público do Estado da Bahia
 Arquivo Público Municipal de Caetité
 Arquivo Público Municipal de Camaçari
 Arquivo Público do Estado do Ceará
 Arquivo Público do Distrito Federal
 Arquivo Histórico Estadual de Goiás
 Arquivo Público Mineiro
 Arquivo Público de Pernambuco
 Arquivo Público do Estado do Piauí
 Arquivo Público do Estado de São Paulo
 Arquivo Histórico de Joinville
 Arquivo Público do Estado de Santa Catarina
 Arquivo Público e Histórico Amadio Vettoretti
 Arquivo Geral da Cidade do Rio de Janeiro
 Arquivo Histórico do Exército
 Arquivo Histórico Municipal de Resende
 Arquivo Municipal de Piraí
 Arquivo Público do Estado do Rio de Janeiro
 Arquivo Histórico do Rio Grande do Sul
 Arquivo Público do Estado do Rio Grande do Sul
 Arquivo Histórico Municipal João Spadari Adami
 Arquivo Histórico de Porto Alegre Moysés Vellinho
 Arquivo da Arquidiocese de São Paulo
 Arquivo Histórico Municipal Capitão Hipólito Antônio Pinheiro
 Arquivo Histórico Municipal Washington Luís

See also 

 List of archives
 List of museums in Brazil
 Culture of Brazil
 History of Brazil

External links 
 General Archives (all)

 
Archives
Brazil
Archives